Nikolai Nikolayevich Aseyev (July 10, 1889 - July 16, 1963) was a Russian and Soviet Futurist poet and writer.

Biography 
Nikolai was born in the city of Lgov in the region of Kursk. He studied a technical school in the city and had also attended the Moscow Institute of Commerce. Aseyev joined the army in 1915 until 1917.

It is said that Velimir Khlebnikov and Vladimir Mayakovsky were two of Aseyev's literary influences.

Works 
In 1914, Aseyev helped form a young poets' group called Lirika. In the same year, his first poetic collections, "Night Flute" (Nochnaia fleita), and "Zor", which were written in the Russian Futurist style, were published. The former also reflected traces of Russian Symbolism. Aseyev was awarded a government honor for the latter poem in 1941.

Aseyev's work has been known for its interest in America. Among his notable poems was A Song about Alabama, which criticized the American conceptualization of a crime punishable by death for blacks. He was also one of those who contributed to the Soviet and American reconciliation narrative. He once wrote the Americans, "You have Abraham, we have a Joseph... let's make a new Bible."

Aseyev died in 1963 in Moscow.

References

External links
Collection of Poems by Nikolay Aseyev (English Translations)
English translation of "Northern Lights," 1921
Nikolay Aseyev. Poems (in Russian)
 English translations of poem "Phantasmagoria"
 Includes English translations of poem "Announcement," 122
 Biography

1889 births
1963 deaths
People from Lgov, Kursk Oblast
People from Lgovsky Uyezd
Russian male poets
Russian male writers
20th-century Russian screenwriters
Male screenwriters
Soviet male writers
Soviet poets
Soviet screenwriters
Futurist writers
Socialist realism writers
20th-century Russian male writers
20th-century Russian poets
National University of Kharkiv alumni
Stalin Prize winners
Recipients of the Order of Lenin
Recipients of the Order of the Red Banner of Labour
Burials at Novodevichy Cemetery